Prayash Singh (born 2 February 1994) is an Indian cricketer. He made his List A debut for Odisha in the 2016–17 Vijay Hazare Trophy on 6 March 2017. He made his Twenty20 debut for Odisha in the 2017–18 Zonal T20 League on 8 January 2018.

References

External links
 

1994 births
Living people
Indian cricketers
Odisha cricketers
People from Nuapada district
Cricketers from Odisha